Hiiu Stadium is a multi-purpose stadium in Tallinn, Estonia. The stadium and the administration building are owned by Nõmme district and are operated by Nõmme Sport Centre (Nõmme spordikeskus). It is used mostly for football matches and is the home stadium of Nõmme Kalju youth teams. The address of the stadium is Pidu tänav 11, Tallinn.

On 10 September 2011, the highest recorded attendance was set, when 2,730 people watched a football match between hosts JK Nõmme Kalju and FC Flora Tallinn.

History

Early years 
The construction of the Hiiu Stadium began in 1930, after Nõmme Kalju, who had previously been playing on a field between Tähe and Rahu streets (where today lies the Nõmme Tennis Center), were in a need for a larger sports ground. The construction was initiated by Kalju's chairman Hugo Sepp and was carried out largely by the footballers themselves. The stadium was opened in 1936.

Hiiu Stadium after the re-establishment of Nõmme Kalju  
After Estonia regained its independence in 1991, Nõmme Kalju was re-established and the club moved back to Hiiu Stadium. 

The stadium was completely renovated in 2002 and cost 8 million Estonian kroon. In 2006, the old artificial turf was replaced by a 3rd generation turf and an administration building with a stand for 300 people was erected.

Nõmme Kalju were promoted to Meistriliiga for the 2008 season. On 10 September 2011, the highest recorded attendance was set, when 2,730 people watched a football match between hosts Nõmme Kalju and FC Flora Tallinn. After four seasons of top-flight football at Hiiu Stadium, the club moved to Kadriorg Stadium in 2012, but returned to Hiiu again in 2015 after it had undergone another renovation.

In 2021, Nõmme Kalju were again forced to move away from Hiiu, as the stadium's artificial turf was declared unfit to host top-flight football. Although the renovation works were supposed to start in 2021, it is still unclear when top-flight football can return to Hiiu Stadium.

Future 
The future renovation of Hiiu Stadium will see the refurbishment of the artificial turf pitch, the construction of a new 1,500-seat grandstand and a perspective 840-seat west stand, an additional smaller artificial training field (75 × 45 m) and the renovation of the stadium's administrative building. The renovation works will be financed by the Estonian Football Association and the Tallinn City Government.

Gallery

References

External links

Stadium entry at Estonian Sports Directory 
Hiiu Stadium at Nõmme Sports Centre 

Football venues in Estonia
Multi-purpose stadiums in Estonia
Sports venues in Tallinn
Nõmme Kalju FC